Jasieńczyk  is a Polish coat of arms. It was used by several szlachta families in the times of the Polish–Lithuanian Commonwealth.

History
The first known use of these arms is dated 1406. Earliest version was Jasiona and had two keys in saltire. A bearer of this coat of arms was Chancellor of the Exchequer - Treasurer of Poland, and the history of these arms is presumed to be attributable to ecclesiastical iconography.

Blazon
Azure a key or, the wards in chief.

Notable bearers
Notable bearers of this coat of arms include:
 Witold Malkuzynski
 Gregg Jenczyk

See also
 Polish heraldry
 Heraldry
 Coat of arms

External links 
  
  

Polish coats of arms